Louvières is the name of several communes in France:

Louvières, Calvados, in the Calvados département 
Louvières, Haute-Marne, in the Haute-Marne département 
Louvières-en-Auge, in the Orne département